Angus Taylor (born 30 September 1966) is an Australian Liberal politician who became the shadow Treasurer after the 2022 election which saw the Australian Labor Party take office. He had previously served in the Morrison Government as Minister for Energy and Emissions Reduction from 2018 to 2022 and as Minister for Industry from 2021 to 2022. A member of the Liberal Party, he has sat in the Australian House of Representatives for the Division of Hume since 2013. Taylor previously served in the Turnbull Government as Minister for Law Enforcement and Cybersecurity from 2017 to 2018.

Taylor is a member of the National Right faction of the Liberal Party.

Early life and education
Taylor was born to Anne and Peter Taylor, who raised him and his three brothers on their historic property Bobingah, a sheep and cattle farm in the foothills of the Australian Alps of New South Wales. His father is a fourth generation sheep farmer. Taylor's maternal grandfather was engineer Sir William Hudson, whom he considered to be a role model. Taylor's mother died from cancer in 1988, aged 48. Her death preceded the collapse of wool and beef prices following a drought, which caused the Taylor family to experience financial struggles. Peter Taylor's experience of drought drove him to advocacy for farmers, becoming President of the NSW Farmers and Vice President of the National Farmers Federation. Taylor's brothers have all taken careers in either business strategy or agribusiness.

Taylor was educated in the public and independent systems, first at Nimmitabel Public School then, as a boarder, at The King's School, Parramatta. Taylor then studied at the University of Sydney while residing at St Andrew's College and graduated with a Bachelor of Economics, winning the university medal and a Bachelor of Laws. He won a Rhodes Scholarship, to study for a Master of Philosophy in Economics at New College, Oxford. Here, he studied "Smith, Bentham, Burke, Mill, Marshall, Schumpeter, Galbraith, Keynes and Friedman" however, it was the game theory of John Forbes Nash Jr. which seems to have taken Taylor's imagination. He used the model to make an analysis of English pubs, recommending they should be protected from being dominated by large brewing companies. While it is curious that a Liberal would be “arguing for more regulation, not less" it's consistent with his belief that, "we shouldn't put up with concentration of power in the hands of a few."

Taylor is one of seven Liberal MPs in the 46th Parliament of Australia who have obtained degrees at an Oxbridge or Ivy League university, the others being Alan Tudge, Josh Frydenberg, Andrew Laming, Dave Sharma, Greg Hunt and Paul Fletcher.

Business life
Immediately after leaving Oxford, Taylor “spent the best part of two decades in management consulting.” He helped create enterprises for clients, notably Fonterra. Equally, he experienced "the ignominy of failure" leading starts ups that did not take off, such as agribusiness dotcom, Farmshed. After consulting, Taylor helped  launch a number of agribusinesses with his brothers and other business partners, including Growth Farms.

Consulting and creation of Fonterra 
Taylor joined his brother Charlie at McKinsey & Co, a global management consulting firm, in 1994. Projects took him to Korea, the US and the UK but most notably to New Zealand, where he worked with dairy farmers to create a new business model for their industry. Taylor “spent four years working on a master plan: to unify the bitterly divided industry into a single national champion." His analysis found “it cost New Zealand farmers around $US12 to produce 100 kilograms of milk product, making them the world’s most efficient producers.” From there he recommended the 10,600 dairy farmers form a multi-national dairy co-operative. Fonterra was launched in October 2001. Two decades later, it was regarded as “one of the most successful strategic decisions in agri-business history" and is used as a business transformation model at Harvard Business School. Taylor returned to Sydney and was made a partner in 1999.  
 
Around this time, Taylor developed a digital agribusiness called Farmshed. He convinced his employer, McKinsey, to back the project along with Wesfarmers, Rural Press and, later, JB Were and NAB. Based in Surry Hills, Taylor was the MD. However, when Wesfarmers merged with IAMA, they began to see Farmshed as undercutting their own business. The online business failed "with a loss of several million dollars.” The Wesfarmers MD, Richard Goyder, later said Farmshed was "years ahead of its time."

Taylor went on to become a Director at Port Jackson Partners, an Australian management consulting firm. During this tenure, Taylor was a member of the Victorian government taskforce to investigate the development of a coal seam gas industry in the state. Reporting in November 2013, the taskforce recommended that the State of Victoria should promote the production of additional and largely on-shore gas supply. He also served as the Director of Rabobank's Executive Development Program for leading farmers in Australia and New Zealand, as well as their Farm Managers Program which focused on younger farmers.

Agribusiness start ups 
After leaving Port Jackson Partners, Taylor developed several businesses with family members and fellow investors, largely connected to irrigation and agriculture. Management of these businesses were relinquished on his taking his seat in parliament. Some of these continue, whole or partly owned by the holding company of Taylor's family Gufee Pty Ltd, a family trust which is declared on Register of Members' Interests.

Eastern Australia Irrigation (EAI) was co-founded by Taylor and he was a director from 2007 to 2012. In mid 2008 he was also a director and secretary of its parent company, Eastern Australia Agriculture (EAA). Records show he never took equity or received a dividend from that corporation and, by the end of 2009 he had ended his relationship with the company. In 2019, Taylor's earlier dealings with the company were given media attention as EAA had sold water licences from two of its agricultural properties back to the Australian government in 2017 for $79 million— a profit to the company of $52 million. In 2018 EAA appears to have paid its Cayman Islands-registered holding company, Eastern Australia Irrigation, $14 million in interest at the extraordinarily high interest rate of around 20%. At the time, Taylor reiterated that he was not connected to the company at the time of the water licence transaction, hadn't been since 2009 and had not received any financial benefit from the water purchase.

Farm Partnerships Australia has been described as a progressive farm-leasing business venture owned by Gufee. By 2015 it was managing 35 properties in Victoria, NSW and Queensland, with a total of 109,000 hectares of land under management. At this time, it's known these properties produced 47,000 bales of cotton, 58,000 tonnes of sugarcane, 25,000ha of winter crops, 157,000 sheep and 15,000 cattle.

Growth Farms is an agribusiness formed by Taylor with his oldest brother, Richard in 1999s, holding a non-controlling stake through Gufee until it sold its interest in early 2020. At first, the company focussed on leveraged-leaseholds of high-rainfall properties in the Southern Tablelands and Monaro. The approach caused serious financing issues as “the cost of it doubled market-wise.” The company then shifted to consulting and by 2015 it was “acting in the purchase of more than $200 million of Australian farmland in the past three years.” It enjoyed early expansion when it won Sir Michael Hintze as a client, managing his 12 properties across Australia. The company manages the very large Queensland properties Clyde and Kia Ora as well as the Kerry Stokes-owned Cygnet Park on Kangaroo Island. The group owns “Hyland Grange”, “Bellevue” and the old Taylor family property “Bobingah” all in the South East of NSW. One of the farms managed by the group is at Corrowong near Delegate. Operations at this property came under the scrutiny of environmental agencies when managers used a herbicide that was later seen to be a threat to an endangered species of native grass. The investigation by NSW Environment & Heritage concluded in April 2017, finding there was no case to answer. The Federal Department of Agriculture, Water and the Environment began its own investigation and Taylor met with officers from the Department of Environment. This has been seen as "a potential breach of the ministerial code of conduct", generating intense media scrutiny, particularly in The Guardian and came to dominate Question Time in Parliament by late 2019. Taylor has been unrepentant, saying, “If I’m not standing up for farmers in the federal parliament, then who is?”

Jam Land is a holding company is also part owned by Gufee Pty Ltd. Taylor's brother and business partner, Richard, is one of the three owners.

JRAT International was company set up for consulting projects in the early 2000s. The company appears to never have begun business operations. Taylor admitted in 2020 that while the company should have appeared on his register of parliamentary interests “the company did no business, and earned no income, and I received absolutely no benefit from it."

Entering Parliament

Taylor first showed an interest in politics when he returned from Oxford, joining the Liberal Party when he was 26. He volunteered as a staffer for Barry O'Farrell, then a member of NSW state parliament who later became Premier. O'Farrell encouraged him to "have a career before politics" and Taylor moved to consulting. About twenty years later, he met John Howard at a Heart Foundation fundraiser where the Prime Minister strongly encouraged Taylor to run for Parliament, saying it's important "we get as many people as possible who have had more life experience." Learning that Alby Schultz, the Member for Hume was considering retirement, in 2011 Taylor moved his family from Woollahra to the Southern Tablelands, on a farm outside of Goulburn, enrolling his children in local schools.

Nomination as candidate 
Schultz announced in April 2012 that he would not re-contest the seat of Hume at the 2013 federal election, and Taylor immediately sought and gained Liberal endorsement for the seat of Hume, 26 votes out of 33. One of the candidates he defeated, Rick Mandelson, later appeared to endorse Taylor, saying "more common sense (is needed) in the Parliament along with someone who's actually done some things, not just academics, lawyers and union reps."

2013 Australian federal election

Taylor's wife, Louise Clegg, stepped back from her career as a barrister and law lecturer to run Taylor's election campaign "with military precision and solid financial support.” Records show he backed his campaign with his own donations during 2012–2013. Under Coalition rules, the Nationals were also entitled to run a candidate against Taylor, but decided not to. Taylor was elected as Member for Hume with over 61% of the two-party preferred vote and over 54% of the primary vote. Taylor joined the Government benches under new Prime Minister Tony Abbott as a "talented and somewhat impatient" MP, with a suspicious view of government procedures. In an interview early in his parliamentary career he said:I hate, I mean really hate, fart-arsing around. I insist on getting things done. And yet that is what government specialises in. It specialises in fart-arsing. In stopping anything from happening, or insisting that the longest route is taken. I do delivery.

Rethinking the Renewable Energy Target 
Soon into his role as a backbencher, Taylor called for an overhaul to the Renewable energy target, which the Liberal Party had supported up to that point. He's known to have written and circulated a paper outlining how many renewable energy projects, in particular wind are increasing electricity costs, and proposed cheaper carbon reduction methods. He was particularly supportive of turning to natural gas as "a better way to reduce carbon emissions." At points he has used inflammatory language against supporters of windpower, describing them as "the new climate religion." As a speaker at the "Wind Power Fraud Rally" Taylor both criticised windpower while accepting the need to reduce emissions: I am not a climate sceptic. For 25 years, I have been concerned about how rising carbon dioxide emissions might have an impact on our climate. It remains a concern of mine today. I do not have a vendetta against renewables. My grandfather was William Hudson – he was the first Commissioner and Chief Engineer of the Snowy Scheme, Australia's greatest ever renewable scheme. He believed in renewables and renewables have been in my blood since the day I was born.

Parliamentary work 
Taylor began working on parliamentary committees on employment, trade and investment growth and public accounts. In these forums he argued against increasing government debt, saying that Australia's long-term prosperity is characterised by high real wages and low inequality, and that only by increasing productivity and participation, will Australia's broad-based prosperity continue. Taylor was not given any portfolio by Tony Abbott during this Parliament. The Australian Financial Review said that he had been "left to languish" which, The Guardian speculated, was because other MPs "had deeper political networks."

Local issues - mobile towers and water  
Mobile phone black spots were a prominent concern for people in the Southern Tablelands and Taylor said he was "determined to fix this." By 2015, funding had been secured for new towers in Wollondilly, one of 18 new towers for the region funded under round 1 of a Federal Program. Goulburn, a town that had suffered badly in 2000s Australian drought, received $10 million in funding for a new wastewater plant.

First Ministries 

In September 2015, the Federal Liberal Party elected a new leader and Malcolm Turnbull was made Prime Minister of Australia. The following year, Turnbull appointed Taylor to his first portfolio.

Assistant Minister for Cities and Digital Transformation 
On 18 February 2016 Taylor was sworn in as the Assistant Minister to the Prime Minister for Cities and Digital Transformation following a rearrangement in the First Turnbull Ministry. This new portfolio gave Taylor scope to encourage innovation, both within government and in small business. He was "instrumental in ensuring that a single digital profile would be adopted for clients of the federal agencies, rather than letting departments run off in all directions.” By May 2017, usage of myGov had doubled in two years. Taylor oversaw commercialisation grants of $11.2 million to 24 Australian start-ups under the Entrepreneur's Program.

2016 Australian federal election 
On 2 July 2016, the Turnbull Government was returned to power with "a severely reduced majority." Taylor faced a pre-selection threat, from Russell Matheson, which was averted. Then came the threat of the redistribution of his seat, making it less regional and more urban, which was thought to favour the Labor Party. He managed to retain his seat with 60.18% of the two party preferred vote.

Minister for Law and Cybersecurity 
Shortly after the election, and with less than two years with his first portfolio, Taylor was brought to the front bench as Minister for Law Enforcement and Cybersecurity. In this role, he appointed the first Commonwealth Transnational Serious and Organised Crime Coordinator. This innovation has been seen as providing "a mechanism to lead and strengthen national disruption efforts" against organised crime. It was also expected to lead to arrests for human trafficking and child pornography.

Minister for Energy 
Taylor was sworn in as Minister for Energy on 28 August 2018. In interviews, he was quick to emphasise that his focus would be on "price, price, price" rather than renewable energy. While reluctant to say the Turnbull-era National Energy Guarantee was "dead" it became clear that the only part of the policy which would remain would be its "focus on reliability." He quickly began receiving criticism for his performance in his portfolio. This began with the ABC querying a "rejected a billion-dollar plan to help struggling households pay their power bills" and, more seriously, that his claims that Australia would still meet its commitments to the Paris Agreement were "not what the figures show." Senator Penny Wong, the Labor leader in the Senate said, "I don't think there's been a climate minister, energy minister who's been more anti-renewable than Angus Taylor."

Cabinet Minister 
Following the 21 August 2018 leadership spill which challenged Malcolm Turnbull for leadership of the Liberal Party, Taylor was one of several frontbenchers to announce his resignation. Taylor wrote in a letter to Turnbull that he was resigning due to his support for Petter Dutton: "I have previously relayed to you my concerns about the direction of this Government, and my views on the policies that should characterise a traditional centre-right Liberal Party." After a second spill later in the week, Turnbull resigned as Prime Minister, with Scott Morrison being elected leader. Taylor was subsequently appointed as Minister for Energy, characterised by Morrison as "Minister for reducing electricity prices". His appointment prompted strong criticism from renewable energy advocates.

2019 Australian federal election 
The Liberal Party was "widely expected" to lose the national poll held on 18 May 2019. In the run up, Taylor was accused of scandal by progressives on Twitter and was targeted in the electorate by the pressure group GetUp! Against pressure to move to a 45% renewable energy target, Taylor put emphasis on reducing the cost of energy with two announcements. First of a default market offer price, which would limit the price that retailers can charge residential and small businesses. and a wholesale price target "at less than $70 a megawatt-hour by the end of 2021." Taylor said a 4000-megawatt portfolio of power projects underwritten by the government would "put the big energy companies on notice" if they did not achieve these price targets. Locally, Taylor campaigned on his record of low unemployment, growth of 1,040 new businesses and infrastructure investments. On the day, Taylor increased his two-party-preferred margin from 10.18% to 12.99%. The Morrison government was returned with a stronger majority and Taylor was invited to join the Second Morrison Ministry. With the win, Taylor said "the confidence and belief in what we are doing, inspired me."

Minister for Energy and Emissions Reduction  
Taylor MP was sworn in as Minister for Energy and Emissions Reduction on 29 May 2019. Criticism for his performance continued and in October 2019, Taylor was said to be repeating misleading claims about the previous Labor government's poor record on carbon emissions. As Minister, Taylor threatened the introduction of "big stick" laws which would force energy companies to make divestments if they did not reduce their energy prices. Analysts began projecting that wholesale energy prices would drop and that 50% of energy would come from renewable sources by 2030, though they would not credit government policy for this. The legislation was later called "extreme and arbitrary" and, as wholesale prices began to fall, the powers the laws provided for have never had to be used.

Strategic oil reserve 
During the COVID-19 recession, Taylor announced the establishment of a National Oil Reserve. This would involve an AUD$94m purchase of oil, reserved for Australia, but stored in the United States. The move went directly against the advice of Australian Institute of Petroleum who have argued that "the crude oil market is a global market and it is well supplied." While supported by conservative Liberal Party backbenchers such as Andrew Hastie, the move has been ridiculed by the Labor leader Anthony Albanese, with the decision to locate the storage in the US as being, "rather bizarre." The move was characterised as a "downpayment'' on doing "something more permanent in Australia" which as a result of closures since the 1990s has only four refineries.

Parliamentary controversy and media coverage
Beginning in 2019 a number of stories about Taylor were exposed publicly. These stories stirred up some controversy about Taylor as a minister. Journalist Anne Davies claims that these stories were "all uncovered by The Guardian" though these stories were subsequently re-reported by other media outlets. By September 2019, Labor opposition leaders began insisting he should "step down" "should resign or be sacked" and "should have stepped down a long time ago." By the end of 2019 Davies described Taylor as going “from the Liberals' golden boy to a man on the edge.” Sky news suggested that any talk of resignation was premature.

 Water rights accusation. Taylor was accused of using $80 million of taxpayers' money to buy water licences from two Queensland properties owned by Eastern Australia Agriculture (EAA). Taylor was a director of EAA, though resigned from his position in November 2009. The Guardian and Greens Senator Sarah Hanson-Young began circulating reporting on this as #watergate. The Twitter campaign was "driven by several activists who support independent political candidates challenging Liberal MPs, including former prime minister Malcolm Turnbull's son, Alex Turnbull, mining heir Simon Holmes à Court, and former Sydney Morning Herald journalist Margo Kingston." The law firm Ashurst LLP was asked to prepare an opinion on the matter. They found that Taylor had never had equity in EAA or any associated company or had any benefit for the sale of any water or land.
 Grasslands clash. In July 2019 activists launched the #Grassgate hashtag on Twitter (which had also been used for an attack on Pep Guardiola at Manchester City F.C.) and accused him of misleading the Australian Parliament on "An investigation into illegal land clearing against a company part-owned by the family of federal minister Angus Taylor." When questioned concerning his involvement in herbicide use and his subsequent meeting with officials, Taylor informed the Parliament that he was discussing "long and detailed concerns" on native grass legislation with a farmer in Yass on 21 February 2017, whereas the Parliamentary Records instead show that Taylor was in Sydney participating in a High Value Data Roundtable discussion. The former environment minister Josh Frydenberg sought urgent information about an investigation by his department against a company in which Taylor and his relatives held an interest. Jam Land, part owned by Taylor and his family, was under investigation for alleged illegal clearing of grasslands at the time. About 30 hectares of the critically endangered grassland known as the natural temperate grassland of the south eastern highlands had been allegedly poisoned at a property in Delegate, New South Wales, in late 2016. The then environment and energy minister, Frydenberg, canvassed whether protections for a critically endangered grassland at the centre of the compliance action could be watered down and if it could be kept secret.
 Forged document controversy. In October 2019, Taylor was accused of having forged a City of Sydney Council document and providing that document to The Daily Telegraph. The incident stemmed from a letter the Lord Mayor of Sydney, Clover Moore wrote to the Minister, asking him to declare "a climate emergency." In his reply to her, Taylor criticised her own department's travel — claiming that the City of Sydney Council spent $15.9 million on travel for the 2017–18 period, which he attributed to an annual report document available on the council's website. Moore responded publicly, saying the figures had been altered as the actual annual report showed they had spent less than $6,000 in travel expenses, and that no report with the figures given by Taylor had ever existed. The matter was referred to NSW Police for investigation by the Australian Labor Party. In October 2019, Taylor apologised to Moore for the incorrect figures, though he and his representatives continued to insist the document was obtained from the Council website, despite evidence to the contrary from archived versions of it on Trove. On 26 November 2019, NSW Police announced that they had commenced an investigation. Despite calls from the opposition for Taylor to be stood down during the investigation, Australian Prime Minister Scott Morrison refused to do so and stated there was "no action required" on his behalf. During the NSW Police investigation, Scott Morrison made a phone call to NSW Police Commissioner Mick Fuller, whom he had a prior relationship as neighbours in Sydney. Both men refused to give details or recordings of the call, although Fuller did say that Morrison did not ask any inappropriate questions, and was only given information that was already in the media release. A former anti-corruption judge said the call appeared to be an attempt by Morrison to influence the investigation. On 1 January 2020, the investigation was referred to the Australian Federal Police (AFP). On 6 February 2020, the AFP announced that they would not continue to pursue an investigation into the origin of the document as it was determined there was no evidence to be found. Clover Moore lodged a formal complaint with the Australian Press Council over The Daily Telegraph article.
 "Well done Angus" meme. Taylor made headlines during the 2019 election campaign when, on 1 May, he posted an article regarding a commitment to building car parks in a neighbouring electorate held by the Labor Party, then there appeared a comment from Taylor saying "Fantastic. Great move. Well done Angus." Taylor was mocked on social media for the act, and it was suggested Taylor or one of his staff were deliberately making positive remarks using false accounts.
 Naomi Wolf conflict. In his 2013 maiden parliamentary speech, Taylor stated he first encountered "political correctness" in 1991 at Oxford University when "a young Naomi Wolf lived a couple of doors down the corridor. Several graduate students ... decided we should abandon the Christmas tree in the common room because some people might be offended." Taylor went on to say democratic rights were being "chipped away by shrill elitist voices". In 2019, after part of the speech was shared online, Wolf noted Taylor's recollection of her was not possible as she left Oxford in 1988, and rejected any implication she opposed Christmas trees as she "loves Christmas". She described his reference to "elites" as "antisemitic dogwhistling." A spokesman for Taylor said he never stated Wolf was one of the graduates against the Christmas tree. Taylor denied any form of antisemitism and demanded an apology from her over the claim, stating the accusation was offensive as he had a Jewish grandparent.
 7th Least Trusted Politician in Australia. In March 2022 Roy Morgan published the results on polling undertaken that placed Angus Taylor as the 7th least trusted politician in Australia, placing behind Dominic Perrottet (6th), Craig Kelly (5th), Pauline Hanson (4th), Barnaby Joyce (3rd), Peter Dutton (2nd) and Scott Morrison (1st).
 Electricity Price Rise Delayed. Before the 2022 Federal Election, Angus Taylor, as Energy Minister, ordered the Australian Energy Regulator to delay their announcement of the Default Market Offer from the 1st of May until the 26th May. The announcement indicated that benchmark electricity prices would rise up to 18.3%. Incoming Energy Minister Chris Bowen accused Taylor of having ordered the delay to increase the coalition's chances at the election which was held on the 21st of May.

Publications 

Taylor has published reports as part of the ANZ Bank Insight series. The first of these, Earth, Fire, Wind and Water – Economic Opportunity and the Australian Commodities Cycle, focused on the opportunities and challenges faced by Australia's commodity exporters in the face of the commodities boom, and was described as a "landmark report" by The Australian. The second report was Greener Pastures – The Soft Commodity Opportunity for Australia and New Zealand, arguing that a soft commodity boom was taking over from the hard commodity boom. Other reports and articles include The Future for Freight, focused on reform in the freight transport sector, and "More to Nation Building than Big Bucks", critiquing the Labor Government's comparison between its National Broadband Network and the Snowy Mountain Scheme.

In February 2013, Taylor authored the report "A proposal to reduce the cost of electricity to Australian electricity users" while a director at Port Jackson Partners. The report said that the Coalition could immediately drop the renewable energy target entirely and save up to 3.2 billion by 2020 and still meet emissions reduction targets.

Taylor was a member of a taskforce asked by the Victorian Government to investigate the development of a coal seam gas industry in the state. Reporting in November 2013, the report found that Victoria should promote the production of additional and largely on-shore gas supply. The taskforce was headed by former federal Liberal minister Peter Reith with other members representing energy companies, associated industries and lobby groups.

Personal life
Taylor is a keen runner and cyclist. He competed in the 2009 ITU Triathlon Age Group World Championship on the Gold Coast representing Australia where he finished 36th in the male 40 to 44 age bracket.

Despite maintaining business accounts in the Cayman Islands he lives near  on a farm with his wife, Sydney barrister Louise Clegg and their four children, moving to the area from Sydney six months before winning pre-selection for the seat of Hume in May 2012.

Taylor's sister-in-law is the Nationals member of the New South Wales Legislative Council Bronnie Taylor.

References

1966 births
Living people
Alumni of New College, Oxford
Australian Rhodes Scholars
Lawyers from Sydney
Politicians from Sydney
Sydney Law School alumni
Liberal Party of Australia members of the Parliament of Australia
Members of the Australian House of Representatives for Hume
Members of the Australian House of Representatives
Turnbull Government
21st-century Australian politicians
Government ministers of Australia
Morrison Government